Jeannine Cook (born in 1944), is a contemporary metalpoint artist who works from her studio in Palma de Mallorca, Spain, after living in the United States. Encouraged to concentrate on art rather than languages and freelance journalism by Jeanne Nelson Szabo, a former Professor of Art at University of California Los Angeles, Cook initially exhibited watercolours in Westchester, New York, and elsewhere in New York from 1979 onwards.

Cook was quickly accepted for membership in such artists’ organisations as the Mamaroneck Artists Guild, Catharine Lorillard Wolfe Artists Club, New York, and the American Artists Professional League, New York, with which she often exhibited. She was subsequently selected for membership in the National Association of Women Artists, The Pen & Brush in New York, and Women’s Caucus for Art, as well as being a Signature Member of the Georgia Watercolor Society.

In 1983, Cook moved with her husband to coastal Georgia, where the couple spent two years building a post-and-beam house bordering on salt water marshes. During this period, she set aside her art practice. When she returned to art, she began to draw in metalpoint, a medium little known amongst both artists and the general public. Soon Cook was exhibiting in solo shows in local museums and galleries in Georgia and beyond, and her drawings and watercolours began to enter numerous museum and private collections. Her work was acquired by the Georgia Art Acquisition Program for Gainesville College in 1986. In 2003, she was awarded a public art commission from the Fulton County Arts Council, Atlanta, Georgia. By 2011, Cook was increasingly specialising in drawing and painting far less in watercolours.

Cook's drawing practice has continued both in the United States and Europe, with frequent solo and group exhibitions on both continents. Her work is now represented in such museums as the British Museum, the Victoria & Albert Museum, and BAMPFA, in Berkeley, California, among many others around the world.

Life 

Cook was born in Kenya, and grew up on her family’s farm in the Northern Province of Tanzania, near Arusha. From an early age she had a keen interest in agriculture, and worked alongside the Africans, Afrikaans, British and Sikhs employed on the mixed farms. With her mother, Patricia Wright, guiding her, she learnt the correct botanical structure and petal colour of innumerable flowers grown commercially for seed, whilst also participating in the cultivation of coffee, seed beans and aromatic plants destined for the perfume trade. Cook's family members were committed environmentalists long before the term became a household word. Living with her parents and widely-travelled grandparents in the same house, Cook was exposed to Australian, European, Asian (particularly Japanese) and African cultural influences. This exposure almost certainly contributed to the development of her passion for nature, travelling and all forms of art. The long fascinated hours she spent in the darkroom with her photographer grandfather led to the genesis of her love of monochromatic photographs and drawings. In addition to these influences, she learned much of local and British politics as both her grandfather, Francis James Anderson, and father, Jack Wright, were very active politically.

Cook finished her high school education at Limuru High School, outside Nairobi, Kenya, at the same time that the then Tanganyika (later Tanzania) became independent. She continued her studies in languages and business in London and Paris, then worked in an international organization, European Launcher Development Organisation (precursor to the European Space Agency), before taking another degree at EFAP, the French communications school. She married British scientist Albert Rundle Cook and moved to New York, where she divided her time between art and non-fiction writing, publishing work in Connoisseur Magazine and other publications. Cook and her husband moved to Georgia in 1983, where she became a full-time artist. Cook worked from her studio in coastal Georgia, before moving to Palma de Mallorca. Her central practice is metalpoint drawing.

Career

Artistic Practice 

Cook is among the early contemporary metalpoint artists currently employing the medium, having undertaken the practice in 1979. Prior to her metalpoint drawing, she had worked as a silversmith.

Frequently cited in written works on the topic of metalpoint, Cook has also taught and presented talks on the technique and curated metalpoint exhibitions.

Metalpoint was famously employed in European monasteries' scriptoria, such as Lindisfarne, in the 8th century AD but centuries before, in AD77, Pliny the Elder had alluded to drawing in silver in his Natural History. Highly conscious of metalpoint’s illustrious heritage, Cook draws mostly in silver, always from real life, and does not lay out any preparatory indications on the drawing surface before starting her drawing in metal. She believes that working directly from life confers spontaneity to a drawing, making it possible for intuition to guide the drawing and allowing the subject matter to dictate. For Cook, this method of drawing allows for unexpected results and opportunities to grow as an artist.

Rigorous in her choice of archival-quality materials, Cook most often prepares her smooth drawing supports in advance with acrylic-based grounds, particularly if she is drawing outdoors in hot and insect-filled environments. Working on paper, board, and occasionally porcelain, the artist lets the silver and copper drawings tarnish naturally.

Like other contemporary metalpoint artists, Cook experiments with the medium, exploring innovative ways to extend its unique properties. She frequently combines touches of colour with the monochromatic drawings, employing such media as Prismacolour, Polychromos pencil, watercolour, Plike paper, Washi papers, silk fabric and silk threads, whilst at other times she uses coloured grounds or coloured supports, such as in the drawing Tillandsia recurvata. Her artistic vocabulary also includes gold and silver foil and marks made with wide metal tools (spoons, rings or bracelets, wedges of silver, etc.). Her drawings on paper are executed in a range of sizes. Her oeuvre also includes artist books and watercolour paintings.

Cook's use of the mark-making metals is varied in style, ranging from realistic drawings of flowers, landscapes and other natural subjects to seemingly abstract studies of barks, stones and other natural materials, often depicted realistically but at close range.

Recent series have included Miro-inspired drawings done in and about the Fundación Pilar i Joan Miró in Palma de Mallorca, Pensando en Miro, a series entitled Terratorium based on the Chablis region in Burgundy, France, and De Natvræ, studies of nature drawn from many different sources. In 2022, Cook embarked on an ambitious large-scale project entitled Olive Tree Waltzes, an ensemble of drawings in silverpoint and goldpoint that are designed to be shown together.

Much of Cook's recent work has been carried out while in residency in France at La Porte Peinte Centre pour les Arts, Noyers sur Serein,  Bordeneuve Retreat, Betchat (Ariège), and Hôtel Sainte Valière, Sainte Valière, as well as in Portugal, at OBRAS, Estremoz.

As Cook has evolved as a metalpoint artist, her choice of subject matter has widened from the early botanical studies which betray the deep influence of her nature-oriented East African life. Deeply passionate about environmental issues, Cook reminds us to wake up, to look, to truly see nature. Her art acts as an advocate for a more informed look at our planet, at details that reveal nature's past and present: hurricane-struck red cedar trees that become burnished silver skeletons, tree barks that bespeak age and endurance, stones that tell of past geological dramas. Given that the majority of the world’s population is now urban, Cook sees the need to share with art lovers the intricacy, elegance and vital importance of even the smallest aspect of life in the natural world. The rarity and allure of the lustrous metalpoint medium arouse curiosity and offer a starting point for dialogue about much wider environmental issues and the rewards that await us when we awaken to nature’s riches.

Exhibitions

Cook's metalpoint drawings have been shown in solo exhibitions in over a dozen museums and galleries in the past ten years, while she has also participated in more than twenty-two juried or invitational metalpoint gallery and museum group shows since 2010 in the United States, Europe and online exhibitions. Exhibition venues include MA Arte Contemporaneo (Palma de Mallorca, Spain), San Diego Museum of Art (San Diego, California), Can Prunera Museu Modernista (Soller, Mallorca), The Ashantilly Center (Darien, GA), Emory University (Atlanta), Birmingham Botanical Gardens (Alabama), Norfolk Arts Center (Norfolk, Nebraska), Fundación Barceló (Mallorca, Spain), Telfair Museums (Savannah, Georgia), National Arts Club (New York), Clement Art Gallery (Troy, New York), Evansville Museum of Arts, History and Science (Indiana), Musée des Arts Naïfs et Populaires de Noyers (Noyers sur Serein, Yonne, France), The Colors of Humanity Art Gallery (online), Marbury NYC (New York, New York), Morris Graves Museum of Art (Eureka, California), Swope Art Museum, (Terre Haute, Indiana), BAMPFA (Berkeley, California)  and North Carolina Museum of Natural Sciences (Raleigh).

Collections
Cook's metalpoint drawings are in the permanent collections of more than twenty public art institutions in Europe, the United States and Australia, including the British Museum (London, England), the Victoria & Albert Museum (London, England), The Fitzwilliam Museum (Cambridge University, UK) New Hall Women’s Art Collection (at Murray Edwards College, Cambridge University, UK), the National Museum of Women in the Arts (Washington), Huntington Museum of Art (Huntington, West Virginia), Fort Wayne Museum of Art (Fort Wayne, Indiana), Gibbes Museum of Art (Charleston, SC), McNay Museum of Art (San Antonio, Texas), Western Australian Museum (Perth, Western Australia), Legion Paper East, (New York, New York), North Carolina Museum of Natural Sciences (Raleigh, NC), Dr. Shirley A. Sherwood Collection (London, England), Mayo Foundation (Rochester, MN), Spring Island Trust (Spring Island, Okatie, South Carolina), and Consell de Mallorca (Balearic Islands Government, Palma de Mallorca, Spain).

References

External links 
 Official website
 IB3 Television, "Jeannine Cook recupera la tènica de la punta de plata, interview with Ana Maria Murillo Ferrer, ENS Públic de Radiotelevisió de les Illes Balears, 15:28, April 10, 2017
 Butler, Wendy, “Artwaves – Jeannine Cook”, KHSU 90.5 (interview on public radio), 29 December 2015

1944 births
Living people
American abstract artists
20th-century American women artists
21st-century American women artists